is a train station in Yūsui, Aira District, Kagoshima prefecture, Japan. It is operated by JR Kyushu and is on the Kitto Line.

Lines

Layout 
The station consists of a side platform serving a single track. There is no station building at this unstaffed station, only a shelter on the platform for waiting passengers. The access road is at a higher level than the station platform which is accessed by going down a short flight of steps. A bike shed is provided at the station entrance.

Adjacent stations

History
Japanese National Railways (JNR) opened the station on 1 February 1958 as an additional station on the existing track of the Kitto Line. With the privatization of JNR on 1 April 1987, the station came under the control of JR Kyushu.

Nearby places 
National Route 268
Tsurumaru Onsen

See also
List of railway stations in Japan

References

External links
Tsurumaru (JR Kyushu)

Railway stations in Japan opened in 1912
Railway stations in Kagoshima Prefecture
Yūsui, Kagoshima